Denise Kum (born 1968) is a New Zealand artist. Her works are held in the collection of Auckland Art Gallery Toi o Tāmaki, Museum of New Zealand Te Papa Tongarewa, and the University of Auckland art collection.

Biography 
Kum was born in Auckland in 1968. She gained a BFA from the Elam School of Fine Arts in 1992. In the same year, Kum was a founding member of Teststrip, an artist-run gallery for contemporary and experimental art.

Teststrip, Auckland's first artist-run gallery, was founded by Lucy MacDonald, Merylyn Tweedie, Giovanni Intra, Daniel Malone, Judy Darragh, Gail Haffern, Kirsty Cameron and Kum. The space was initially set up to provide the founding artists with a venue for showing their work. Teststrip received a small grant from Creative New Zealand in 1995, which enabled the move to a new space on Karangahape Rd and employment of a paid administrator. Teststrip began connecting with networks of similar galleries overseas, and their international advisory board included Lilian Budd, Kathy Temin, Mikala Dwyer and Harmony Korine. The decision was made to close Teststrip in 1998 resulted from a desire to finish "cleanly and strongly, rather than peter out or recruit." Teststrips micrograph publishing project continued working after the gallery closed.

Kum is known for her work with experimental home-made plastics, and her works with consumable materials such as beeswax, seaweed and food, often allowed to decay and breakdown.

Exhibitions 

 The Secret Life of Paint (2007), Dunedin Public Art Gallery
 Fondant (2004), Economist Tower foyer, London
 Bloom (2003), Govett-Brewster Art Gallery, New Plymouth
 New Work (2002), Sue Crockford Gallery, Auckland
 Alive!: Still Life into the Twenty First Century (2001), Adam Art Gallery, Wellington
 Plastika (2000), Govett-Brewster Art Gallery, New Plymouth
 Leap of Faith (1998), Govett-Brewster Art Gallery, New Plymouth
 Currents (1998), Govett-Brewster Art Gallery, New Plymouth
 11th Biennale of Sydney (1998), Sydney
 Thinking About Contemporary Art (1997), Centre of Contemporary Art, Christchurch
 Transfusion/Fusion (1996), Hong Kong Arts Centre, Hong Kong and Auckland Art Gallery Toi o Tāmaki. This show was a culmination of a Hong Kong- New Zealand artists exchange, and presented works from three New Zealand artists – Kum, Luise Fong and Yuk King Tan.
 The Nervous System (1995), City Gallery Wellington, and Govett-Brewster Art Gallery, New Plymouth
 Northern Exposure (1995), McDougall Art Annex, Christchurch
 Recent Sculptitecture, Horribly Desirable (1995), Hamish McKay Gallery, Wellington
 n+1 Cultures (1994), Artspace, Auckland
 Art Now: The First Biennial Review of Contemporary Art (1994), Museum of New Zealand Te Papa Tongarewa, Wellington
 Localities of Desire: Contemporary Art in an International World (1994), Museum of Contemporary Art, Sydney
 Tales Untold: Unearthing Christchurch Histories (1994), Christchurch
 Mediatrix (1993–94), Artspace and the Govett-Brewster Art Gallery, Auckland
 Under My Skin (1993), High Street Project Gallery, Christchurch

References 

New Zealand women artists
Living people
1968 births